Derek Ball (died 26 July 1989) was a British sound engineer. He won an Academy Award for Best Sound for the film Star Wars Episode IV: A New Hope. He worked on 40 films between 1968 and 1987.

Selected filmography
 Star Wars Episode IV: A New Hope (1977)

References

External links

Year of birth missing
1989 deaths
British audio engineers
Best Sound BAFTA Award winners
Best Sound Mixing Academy Award winners